Several steamships have been named Patria.

 – later called SS Patria
 – sunk in the Patria disaster in 1940 in the Port of Haifa, Mandatory Palestine

See also
 

Ship names